Shin Nemi, also known as Ma Hne Galay or Shin Mihne, is the 37th Burmese nat in the official pantheon of nats.  She is the daughter of Thonbanhla and died of grief from her mother's death.

References 

37
Burmese goddesses